Aliabad (also Romanized as ‘Alīābād) is a village in Khonjesht Rural District, in the Central District of Eqlid County, Fars Province, Iran. At the 2006 census, its population was 589, in 134 families.

References 

Populated places in Eqlid County